Rain of a Thousand Flames is the fourth studio album released by Rhapsody in 2001. It tells a part of The Emerald Sword Saga, but it is a parallel episode that is not essential to the story, taking place shortly after Dawn of Victory. While the Warrior of Ice is away, Akron uses the newly acquired Emerald Sword to ravage the land. The album was released at a reduced price and is considered a stop gap between the band's main releases.

Track listing

Credits

"Queen of the Dark Horizons" - the chorus is based on the main theme of the horror picture Phenomena, by the Italian 1970s prog rock band Goblin.
"Elnor's Magic Valley" is based on an Irish traditional music called Cooley's Reel
"The Wizard's Last Rhymes" - the chorus is based on the New World Symphony composed by Antonín Dvořák.

Choir vocals performed by Olaf Hayer, Oliver Hartmann and Tobias Sammet.

Tracks 4-7 together form Rhymes of a Tragic Poem - The Gothic Saga.

Charts

References

External links 
 Lyrics

2001 albums
Rhapsody of Fire albums
Limb Music albums